John Russell Rickford (born September 16, 1949) is a Guyanese–American academic and author. Rickford is the J. E. Wallace Sterling Professor of Linguistics and the Humanities at Stanford University's Department of Linguistics and the Stanford Graduate School of Education, where he has taught since 1980. His book Spoken Soul: The Story of Black English, which he wrote together with his son, Russell J. Rickford, won the American Book Award in 2000.

Rickford is married to Angela Rickford. The two have four children: Shiyama, Russell, Anakela, and Luke.

Life and Work

Education 
Rickford earned his B.A. in Sociolinguistics at the University of California, Santa Cruz (1968–1971) on a Fulbright undergraduate scholarship. Rickford continued his education at the University of Pennsylvania where he earned his MA in linguistics (1971–1973) and later his PhD in linguistics in 1979.

Professional career 
Before working at Stanford University, Rickford held lectures in linguistics at the University of Guyana and was named Assistant Dean, Faculty of Arts, between 1979 and 1980. He later started teaching at Stanford University in 1980 as a Visiting Assistant Linguistics Professor before being named Associate Professor, with tenure, in linguistics (1986). While working in the United States, Rickford has kept contact with the University of Guyana as external examiner for linguistics courses, MA, and PhD theses (1982–present).

Field of expertise 
Rickford's sociolinguistic research focuses on the relation between language variation and ethnicity, social class, variation and change. He is especially interested in the varieties of English spoken by marginalized communities in relation to ethical and economical characteristics. His research focuses on African American Vernacular English (AAVE) or Ebonics, spoken by many African Americans and the role linguistics plays in the educational context. Through his work, Rickford aims to close linguistic gaps across cultures.

Rickford's expertise is African American Vernacular English, which garnered national attention in the U.S. when the Oakland, California school board recognized the variety as an official dialect of English and educated teachers in its use. Rickford argues that AAVE is systematic and rule-governed like all natural speech. Rickford has researched and written extensively on the topic and was an outspoken supporter of the decision.

Rickford also engages in research regarding pidgin and creole languages. Most of Rickford's data comes from English-based creoles of the Caribbean. Especially, Guyanese Creole, Jamaican and Barbadian and American English. He is the author, co-author and or editor of 117 academic scholarly articles and 16 books between since his first publication in 1974.

Memberships in professional societies 
 Member: American Anthropological Association, American Dialect Society, International Sociolinguistics Association, Linguistic Society of America et al.
 Executive committee member: Linguistic Society of America, et al.
 Vice-President, President and Immediate Past President: Society for Pidgin and Creole Linguistics, Society for Caribbean Linguistics, Linguistic Society of America et al.
 President of the Society for Caribbean Linguistics (2008)
 President of the Linguistic Society of America (2015–2016)
 Elected to the American Academy of Arts and Sciences (2017)
 Member of the U. S. National Academy of Sciences (2021)

Selected publications

Earlier publications 
 "The Insights of the Mesolect." In Pidgins and Creoles: Current Trends and Prospects, ed. D. DeCamp and I. Hancock, 92–117. Washington, D. C.: Georgetown U. Press, 1974.
 "The Question of Prior Creolization in Black English." In Pidgin and Creole Linguistics, ed. A. Valdman, 126-46. Bloomington, Indiana: Indiana U. Press, 1977.
 (Ed.), A Festival of Guyanese Words. Georgetown: University of Guyana. Second edition, revised and expanded, 1978.
 "The Question of Prior Creolization in Black English." In Pidgin and Creole Linguistics, ed. A. Valdman, 126-46. Bloomington, Indiana: Indiana U. Press, 1985.
 Dimensions of a Creole Continuum, Stanford (1987): Stanford University Press.
 African American English, ed. by Salikoko S. Mufwene, John R. Rickford, Guy Bailey and John Baugh. London: Routledge, 1998.
 African American Vernacular English: Features and Use, Evolution, and Educational Implications, Oxford (1999): Blackwell.
 Spoken Soul: The Story of Black English. (With Russell J. Rickford) New York: John Wiley, 2000. [Winner of a 2000 American Book Award]

Later publications 
 Language in the USA: Themes for the Twenty-First Century, ed. (With Edward Finegan). Cambridge: Cambridge University Press, 2004.
 "Girlz II Women: Age-grading, language change, and stylistic variation." Journal of Sociolinguistics, vol. 17, no. 2, pp. 143–179, 2013.
 "Style shifting in a creole-speaking community." PAPIA, São Paulo, vol. 24 no. 1, pp. 217–238, 2014.
 "Teaching English to Vernacular Speakers in US and Caribbean Schools." (With Angela E. Rickford.) In Hazel Simmons-McDonald and Ian F. Robertson, eds. Education Issues in Creole and Creole-Influenced Contexts, 271-29, 2014.
 "African American Vernacular English in California: A vibrant half century of study." In Oxford Handbook of African American Language,ii e.g. by Sonja Lanehart, 299–315. Oxford: Oxford University Press, 2016.
 "Language and linguistics on trial: Hearing Rachel Jeantel and other vernacular speakers in the courtroom and beyond." Language vol. 92, no. 4, 2016, pp. 948–988.
 "The Creole Origins Hypothesis." in Lanehart, Sonja (ed.) The Oxford Handbook of African American Language. (2015): Oxford University Press.

References

External links
 Profile at Stanford University
 Writings on the "Ebonics" issue

1949 births
African-American academics
Stanford University Department of Linguistics faculty
Living people
Sociolinguists
People from Georgetown, Guyana
Academic staff of the University of Guyana
American Book Award winners
Linguistic Society of America presidents
Members of the United States National Academy of Sciences
21st-century African-American people
20th-century African-American people